Mladen Karoglan (born 6 February 1964) is a Croatian retired football forward, who spent eight seasons playing in Portugal where he had shown his scoring ability.

Club career
Karoglan started as a junior at Hajduk Split and after a spell at Iskra Bugojno, where he played alongside Dražen Ladić, he joined Dinamo Vinkovci. After a season at Zagreb he was lured to Portuguese side Chaves where he formed a strike partnership with Finnish international Kimmo Tarkkio.

References

External links
 
  at forum.b92.net

1964 births
Living people
Sportspeople from Imotski
Association football forwards
Yugoslav footballers
Croatian footballers
HNK Hajduk Split players
NK Iskra Bugojno players
HNK Cibalia players
NK Zagreb players
G.D. Chaves players
S.C. Braga players
Yugoslav First League players
Primeira Liga players
Croatian expatriate sportspeople in Portugal
Expatriate footballers in Portugal
Croatian football managers